Centro Studi Internazionali (CSI) is a think tank based in Naples, Italy. The center conducts policy studies and strategic analyses of political, economic and security issues throughout the world, with a specific focus on issues concerning international relations, trade, energy and geostrategy.

History 
The CSI was founded in Via Martucci in Naples in 1992. Since then, it has become the main think tank focused international relations in Naples, together with the Neapolitan branch of SIOI (active until its closure in 2020).

Since 1992, the CSI initiated contacts with the Eurostat for the creation of an international documentation center in Naples, in particular for OSCE documents on international trade's developments.

In December of the same year, the first issue of the CSI, Studi Internazionali magazine, was published. The magazine was later revisited in 2020 with the name of CSI Review.

The early years were characterized by intense conference and seminar activities in Naples and Rome with foreign diplomatic representations. Various events on human rights issues were held in collaboration with institutions such as the Italian League of Human Rights, the Italian Institute of Social Sciences, the Italian Institute of Studies Philosophical and Amnesty International. Between 1999 and 2006, CSI produced several publications on historical, demographic and social science topics.

In 2003, President Antonio Virgili personally conferred the Prize of the Centro Studi Internazionali in Rome to the Dalai Lama Tenzin Gyatso, former Nobel Peace Prize winner, for his contribution to the ideals of peaceful international coexistence.

Great attention has always been paid to the youngest generations by the CSI. Numerous activities were carried out in high schools to bring students closer to international relations, especially between 2004 and 2016. Thanks to its activities, the CSI was included in January 2006 in the Italian National Research Registry of the Ministry of Education.

In 2016 the Center joined the Academic Impact international network of the United Nations, a research initiative that brings together university and institutions to promote the protection and research of human right. In the same year a partnership was signed with the Lazarus Union and the Corpo Italiano di San Lazzaro to carry out the "GirlUp" project of the United Nations Foundation within schools.

Between 2019 and 2020, the CSI was renewed with a young management by PhD students, young professionals and researchers by focusing on research activities, analysis and communication. In a short time, the CSI regained its usual vitality, demonstrated also by the creation of numerous partnerships. Activities in recent years include hearings with the Italian Presidency of the Council of Ministers and participation in the Krynica Economic Forum, in which the CSI is among the partners of the 2021 and 2022 editions.

Activities 
The Center carries out analysis, consultancy and research activities on issues related to geopolitics, international relations, defense and economics. The research activities of the CSI are divided into three areas: European Union, Italian foreign policy, and Elections Hub.

References

External links
 

Security studies
Think tanks based in Italy
Organizations established in 1992
Foreign policy and strategy think tanks in Europe